Karusasaurus jordani, Jordan's girdled lizard or the Namibian girdled lizard, is a species of lizard in the family Cordylidae. It is a small, spiny lizard found in Namibia.

Etymology
The specific name, jordani, is in honor of German-born British entomologist Heinrich Ernst Karl Jordan.

References

Karusasaurus
Reptiles of Namibia
Endemic fauna of Namibia
Reptiles described in 1936
Taxa named by Hampton Wildman Parker